Alphabeasts is a children's picture book, written and illustrated by Wallace Edwards, and published in 2002. The book uses illustrations of anthropomorphized animals to teach young learners the English alphabet. Alphabeasts won a Canadian Governor General's Literary Award in 2002 and was named a Gold Medal Book of the Year by ForeWord Reviews Magazine.

References

2002 children's books
Canadian children's books
Canadian picture books
Alphabet books